Johann Lucas Kracker, also Jan Lukáš Kracker or János Lukács Kracker (3 March 1717, Vienna - 1 December 1779, Eger) was an Austrian-Czech painter of the late Baroque period. His work consisted mostly of ceiling or wall frescoes and altarpieces.

Life 
His family originally came from Bohemia and his father, Josef Kracker (1683–1733), was a sculptor. He received his first training with Anton Hertzog (1692–1740) and continued at the Academy of Fine Arts Vienna after 1738, where his teachers included Paul Troger and Michelangelo Unterberger. His first frescoes, created for the Schlosskirche St. Martin (Graz) in 1742, have not survived.

Initially, he was employed at a workshop in Brno, later becoming independent and working throughout Moravia, briefly settling in Znojmo, where he got married. He then moved on to Upper Hungary in 1754, where he worked in Šaštín and Prešov (both now in Slovakia). From 1760 to 1761, he was in Prague where, despite objections from the Prague Painters' Guild, he executed frescoes at the Church of St. Nikolaus in Malá Strana. From 1762 to 1764, he painted at the Monastery and the Premonstratensian Church in Jasov.

In 1767, he settled in Eger. Bishop  commissioned him to do work for the Diocese of Eger and at the Bishop's properties. Three years later, he created the altarpiece for the "Minoritenkirche" (Franciscan Church) and in 1777 he produced his masterpiece depicting the Council of Trent at the Líceum. He remained in the Bishop's service for the rest of his life, although he occasionally travelled to execute small commissions elsewhere.

References

Further reading 
 Anna Jávor, Johann Lucas Kracker : ein Maler des Spätbarock in Mitteleuropa, Enciklopédia, (2005)  
 B. Balážová et al., Medzi zemou a nebom - majstri barokovej fresky na Slovensku, (Between earth and heaven - masters of baroque frescoes in Slovakia), Societas Historiae Artium and the Institute of Art History, Academy of Sciences, Bratislava, 2009,

External links 

 

1717 births
1779 deaths
Austrian painters
Austrian male painters
Czech painters
Czech male painters
Religious art